Saint-Alfred is a municipality in the Municipalité régionale de comté Beauce-Centre in Quebec, Canada. It is part of the Chaudière-Appalaches region and the population is 519 as of 2021. It is named after Alfred the Great and as a tribute to Joseph-Alfred Langlois, Bishop of Valleyfield.

References

Commission de toponymie du Québec
Ministère des Affaires municipales, des Régions et de l'Occupation du territoire

Municipalities in Quebec
Incorporated places in Chaudière-Appalaches